Blastobasis chloroptris is a moth in the family Blastobasidae. It was described by Edward Meyrick in 1931. It is found in Malaysia.

References

Blastobasis
Moths described in 1931